The Mysterious Castle in the Carpathians is a 1981 Czech comedy film directed by Oldřich Lipský. It is based on Jules Verne's novel The Carpathian Castle.

Production
The film marks Lipský's third and final collaboration with screenwriter Jiří Brdečka. Props were created by artist Jan Švankmajer.

Cast
 Michal Dočolomanský as Count Teleke z Tölökö
 Jan Hartl as Vilja Dézi
 Miloš Kopecký as Baron Robert Gorc of Gorcena
 Rudolf Hrušínský as Professor Orfanik
 Vlastimil Brodský as Butler Ignác
 Jaroslava Kretschmerová as Myriota
 Evelyna Steimarová as Primadona Salsa Verde
 Augustín Kubáň as Servant Zutro aka Tóma Hluchoněmec
 Jan Skopeček as Frik

See also
 Dinner for Adele

References

External links
 

1981 comedy films
1981 films
Films directed by Oldřich Lipský
Czech science fiction comedy films
Jan Švankmajer
Films based on works by Jules Verne
Films with screenplays by Jiří Brdečka
Czechoslovak science fiction comedy films
1980s Czech films
Czech parody films